Haris may refer to:


Places
 Haris, Mazandaran, a village in Mazandaran Province, Iran
 Haris, Salfit, a Palestinian village in the West Bank
 Haris or Hariss, a southern Lebanese village

People
 Haris (given name), including a list of people
 Haris (surname), a list of people
 Haris Alagic, stage name Haris, Dutch singer-songwriter and guitarist
 Haris (caste), people of indigenous origin found in the Indian state of West Bengal

Other uses
  a traditional name of Gamma Boötis, a star
 Tichu, card game also known as Haris

See also
 Heris (disambiguation)
 Harish (disambiguation)
 Harris (disambiguation)